Shri Ram Institute of Technology (SRIT) is an engineering college located in Jabalpur in the state of Madhya Pradesh, India. The college was established in 2001. The institute is a part of Shri Ram Group Jabalpur.

History
Shri Ram Institute of Technology was established on 9 July 2001 by S P Kosta, an educator and electronics scientist, and Prof. N. George. They are also the heads of the Shri Ram Group.

Campus
The institute is located in Jabalpur, approximately two kilometres from Kachnar City a popular locality in Jabalpur city.
It provides courses in more than 20 undergraduate and postgraduate programs.

Affiliation and accreditation
SRIT Jabalpur is affiliated with two universities in Madhya Pradesh, namely Rajiv Gandhi Proudyogiki Vishwavidyalaya in Bhopal and Rani Durgavati University in Jabalpur.
The college has been accredited by the All India Council for Technical Education, the PCI of New Delhi and the Government of Madhya Pradesh.

Admission
Admission to the Bachelor of Engineering course is based on the Joint Entrance Examination. At the post-graduate level, a candidate must qualify under the Graduate Aptitude Test in Engineering.

Courses
Shri Ram Institute of Technology, Jabalpur offers both under-graduate and post-graduate courses.
 Bachelor of Engineering
 Master of Engineering/Technology 
 Master of Computer Applications
 Master of Business Administration
 Bachelor of Pharmacy
 Master of Pharmacy

Bachelor of Engineering
The Bachelor of Engineering is a four-year program consisting of the following streams:

 Computer Science and Engineering
 Civil Engineering
 Electrical Engineering
 Electrical & Electronics Engineering
 Electronics and Communication Engineering
 Information Technology Engineering
 Mechanical Engineering

Master of Engineering
The Masters of Engineering is a two-year program offered to Engineering graduates in the following streams:
 ME in Electronics and Communication Engineering
 ME in Computer Science & Engineering (CSE)
 ME in System Software(SS)
 ME in Heat Power Engineering
 M. Tech. in Microwave Engineering
 M. Tech. in VLSI Design
 M.Tech. in Computer Technology & Application (CTA)
 M. Tech. in Power System
 M. Tech. in Machine Design

Rankings

References

Engineering colleges in Madhya Pradesh
Education in Jabalpur